Justin Smith Morrill (April 14, 1810December 28, 1898) was an American politician and entrepreneur who represented Vermont in the United States House of Representatives (1855–1867) and United States Senate (1867–1898). He is most widely remembered for the Morrill Land-Grant Acts that provided federal funding for establishing many of the United States' public colleges and universities. Originally a Whig, after that party became defunct Morrill was one of the founders of the Republican Party.

A native of Strafford, Vermont, Morrill was educated in the schools of Strafford,  Thetford Academy and Randolph Academy. He worked as a merchant's clerk in Maine and Vermont, then embarked on a business career. In partnership with Jedediah H. Harris, Morrill owned and operated several stores in towns throughout Vermont. The success of his stores enabled Morrill to invest profitably in a farm, banks, railroads, and real estate.

Morrill was active in politics as a Whig, and was elected to Congress in 1854. The party became defunct soon afterwards, and Morrill was a founder of the new Republican Party. He won reelection to the U.S. House every two years from 1856 to 1864, and he served from March 1857 to March 1867. During his House service, Morrill served as chairman of the Ways and Means Committee and the House Republican Conference.

In 1866, Morrill was elected to the U.S. Senate, and he served from March 1867 until his death. During his Senate career, Morrill was chairman of the Senate Finance Committee and the Joint Committee on Public Buildings. Morrill died in Washington, D.C., on December 28, 1898. He was buried at Strafford Cemetery.

Early life
Morrill was born in Strafford, Vermont, on April 14, 1810, the son of  Mary Hunt (Proctor) Morrill and Nathaniel Morrill, a farmer, blacksmith, and militia leader who attained the rank of colonel. Morrill attended the common schools of Strafford, Thetford Academy and Randolph Academy. He then trained for a business career by working as a merchant's clerk in Strafford and Portland, Maine.  He then was a merchant in Strafford, and the partnership in which he participated with Judge Jedediah H. Harris grew to own and operate four stores throughout the state.  Morrill also served in local offices including Town Auditor and Justice of the Peace.

One of Judge Harris's daughters married Portus Baxter, who also served in Congress. Baxter and Morrill became close friends as a result of the connection to Judge Harris, with Morrill referring to Baxter as "one of nature's noblemen" and Baxter consciously patterning his business and political career on Morrill's.

Morrill invested in several successful ventures, including banks, railroads, and real estate. By the late 1840s he was financially secure enough to retire, and he became a gentleman farmer.

In addition to farming, Morrill became active in the Whig Party, including serving as chairman of the Orange County Whig Committee, a member of the Vermont State Whig Committee, and a Delegate to the 1852 Whig National Convention.

Congressional career

In 1854 Morrill was elected to the Thirty-fourth Congress as a Whig. He was a founder of the Republican Party, and won reelection five times as a Republican, serving from March 4, 1855, to March 3, 1867. He served as chairman of the Committee on Ways and Means in the Thirty-ninth Congress. He also served on the Joint Committee on Reconstruction, which drafted the Fourteenth Amendment to the United States Constitution.

In 1866 Morrill was elected to the U.S. Senate as a Union Republican. He was reelected as a Republican in 1872, 1878, 1884, 1890, and 1896, and served from March 4, 1867, until his death, almost thirty-one years. He served as chairman of the Committee on Public Buildings and Grounds (Forty-first through Forty-fourth Congresses) where he played a vital role in obtaining the current Library of Congress main building through his work on the Joint Select Committee on Additional Accommodations for the Library. He also served as chairman of the Committee on Finance (Forty-fifth, Forty-seventh through Fifty-second, Fifty-fourth and Fifty-fifth Congresses). In addition, Morrill was a regent of the Smithsonian Institution from 1883 to 1898 and a trustee of the University of Vermont from 1865 to 1898.

Legislation

The Morrill Tariff of 1861 was a protective tariff law adopted on March 2, 1861.  Passed after anti-tariff southerners had left Congress during the process of secession, Morrill designed it with the advice of Pennsylvania economist Henry C. Carey.  It was one of the last acts signed into law by James Buchanan, and replaced the Tariff of 1857.  Additional tariffs Morrill sponsored were passed to raise revenue during the American Civil War.

Morrill is best known for sponsoring the Morrill Act, also known as the Land Grant College Act.  This act was signed into law by Abraham Lincoln in 1862, and established federal funding for higher education in every state of the country. In his own words:

He also authored the Morrill Anti-Bigamy Act of 1862, which targeted the Church of Jesus Christ of Latter-day Saints, based on the then-existing practice of plural marriage (polygamy). It imposed a five-hundred dollar fine and up to five years imprisonment for the crime of polygamy. On January 6, 1879, in Reynolds v. United States the Supreme Court, upheld the Anti-Bigamy Act's ban on plural marriage.

While serving in the U.S. House, Morrill secured passage of legislation to establish the National Statuary Hall Collection inside the United States Capitol. Under the provisions of this 1864 law, each state is permitted to provide two statues of noteworthy citizens for display inside the Capitol.

A second Land Grant College Act in 1890 targeted the former Confederate states and led to the creation of several historically black colleges and universities.

The Land Grant College Acts ultimately led to the founding of 106 colleges including many state universities, polytechnic colleges, and agricultural and mechanical colleges.

Personal

In 1851, Morrill married Ruth Barrell Swan (1822–1898) of Easton, Massachusetts. They had two children. Justin Harris Morrill (1853–1855) died in childhood. James Swan Morrill (1857–1910) graduated from the University of Vermont in 1880 and Columbian College Law School in 1882. He was a lawyer and farmer and served in a variety of offices including as a member of the Vermont House of Representatives. He wrote Self-Consciousness of Noted Persons, published in 1886.

Morrill died in Washington, D.C. on December 28, 1898.  He was buried at Strafford Cemetery.

At the time of Morrill's death his 43 years and 299 days of continuous Congressional service was the longest in U.S. history.  He has since been surpassed, but still ranks 26th as of March 2021.

Legacy

The Justin Smith Morrill Homestead in Strafford is a National Historic Landmark.

Many colleges established under the Morrill Act created a 'Morrill Hall' in his honor.

Morrill was initiated into the Delta Upsilon fraternity as an honorary member in 1864.  He received honorary degrees from the University of Vermont, University of Pennsylvania, Dartmouth College, and many other institutions.

Justin Morrill College at Michigan State University was named for him.

In 1962, the U.S. Postal Service issued a 4 cent postage stamp to celebrate the centennial of the Morrill Land-Grant College Act.  In 1999, the Postal Service issued a 55 cent Great Americans series postage stamp of Morrill to honor his role in establishing the land grant colleges.

In 1967 Ohio State University opened two residence halls on its campus.  Named for Morrill and Abraham Lincoln, they are also known as The Towers. They are the tallest buildings on the OSU campus, and among the tallest in Columbus Ohio.

See also
List of United States Congress members who died in office (1790–1899)

References

Further reading
Cross, Coy F. Justin Smith Morrill, Father of the Land-Grant Colleges. Michigan State University Press: 1999. .
 Memorial Address on the Life and Character of Justin S. Morrill. Government Printing Office: 1899.

External links

  Includes Guide to Research Collections where his papers are located.
 

"An Audacious Act: How a High School Dropout Helped Educate America" produced by WFCR New England Public Radio and journalist Lisa Mullins
NDSU shrine to Morrill
Vermont Division for Historic Preservation
 Friends of the Morrill Homestead
 Justin Morrill: Land For Learning Documentary produced by Vermont Public Television
 Justin S. Morrill papers at Baker Library Special Collections, Harvard Business School.

1810 births
1898 deaths
People of Vermont in the American Civil War
Vermont culture
People from Strafford, Vermont
Republican Party United States senators from Vermont
Burials in Vermont
Whig Party members of the United States House of Representatives from Vermont
Republican Party members of the United States House of Representatives from Vermont
Half-Breeds (Republican Party)
19th-century American politicians
Thetford Academy, Vermont alumni